Aleksander Szenajch (26 August 1904 – 5 June 1987) was a Polish sprinter. He competed in the men's 100 metres and the men's 200 metres events at the 1924 Summer Olympics.

References

External links
 

1904 births
1987 deaths
Athletes (track and field) at the 1924 Summer Olympics
Polish male sprinters
Olympic athletes of Poland
Athletes from Warsaw
People from Warsaw Governorate
Polish people of the Polish–Soviet War
20th-century Polish people
Polish emigrants to Belgium